Smooth Sailing is the second album led by jazz pianist and mathematician Rob Schneiderman, released on the Reservoir label in 1990.

Reception 

The album received a three-star rating on AllMusic.

Track listing 
All compositions by Rob Schneiderman except where noted
 "Harlem Afternoon" - 6:56
 "Lost and Found" - 8:22
 "Rebound" - 7:05
 "It Never Entered My Mind" (Richard Rodgers, Lorenz Hart) - 5:05
 "Smooth Sailing" - 5:33
 "Juvenesence" - 8:28
 "Two Hearts That Pass in the Night" (Ernesto Lecuona, Forman Brown) - 5:03
 "Sonhozinho" - 6:58
 "You Stepped Out of a Dream" (Gus Kahn, Nacio Herb Brown) - 9:12
 "Naughty but Nice" (Harry Warren, Johnny Mercer) - 6:43

Credits 
 Bass – Rufus Reid
 Drums – Billy Higgins
 Piano – Rob Schneiderman
 Produced by Mark Feldman
 Recorded by Rudy Van Gelder
 Written by Rob Schneiderman (tracks: 1, 2, 3, 5, 6, 8)
 Cover [Cover Engraving] – W.H. Bartlett
 Design – B. Robert Johnson
 Liner notes – Peter Leitch

References 

Rob Schneiderman albums
1990 albums
Reservoir Records albums
Albums recorded at Van Gelder Studio